Hazem Harba is a former Syrian footballer who played for Syria national football team.

Career
Harba played for most of his career in Omayya and Tishreen, winning the Syrian Premier League with Tishreen in 1997.

References

1970 births
Syrian footballers
Living people
Syria international footballers
Tishreen SC players
Al-Jaish Damascus players
Al Jazira Club players
UAE Pro League players
Hurriya SC players
Association football forwards
Syrian Premier League players